Aldi Talk (also known as MEDIONmobile, ALDImobile, Aldi Suisse Mobile and HoT Hofer Telekom) are mobile virtual network operator in Germany, Australia, Switzerland, Austria and Slovenia. The brands are an invention of Aldi, which are used country-specific. In Germany, it uses the Telefónica Germany network (since 2014; before, it used E-Plus). In Australia it uses Telstra Wholesale. In Switzerland it uses Sunrise UPC. In Austria, it uses Magenta Telekom. In Slovenia, it uses A1 Slovenija.

History

Aldi Talk was founded on 7 December 2005 in Germany, 2007 in Switzerland and Belgium, July 2009 in the Netherlands and March 2013 in Australia. The related brand HoT Hofer Telekom was founded in January 2015 in Austria and on 11 May 2017 in Slovenia. Medion AG is the mobile virtual network enabler (MVNE) for Aldi Talk in Germany and Australia, while the MVNE for HoT Hofer Telekom is Ventocom GmbH.

End of Belgian operations 
On 7 April 2017, it was announced that Aldi Talk would cease all operations in Belgium by 6 June. The cause of this decision was the coming in to effect of an anti-terrorism measure taken by the Belgian government, banning the sale and use of anonymous SIM cards, instead requiring the mobile operators to identify and register each of their clients. Because Aldi Talk did not have the necessary capabilities to perform these tasks, a decision was taken to cease all operations in Belgium.

End of Netherlands operations 
From the year 2009 until June 2022 Aldi talk was also represented in the Netherlands by KPN.

References

External links

 Germany official website
 Australia's official website
 Austria official website
 Slovenia's official website
 Switzerland's official website

Aldi
Mobile virtual network operators
Telecommunications companies of Australia
Telecommunications companies of Germany
Telecommunications companies of Austria
Telecommunications companies of Slovenia
Telecommunications companies of Switzerland